This is a list of members of the Trilateral Commission.

Leadership positions

Membership by country

Current list of members
The following is a list of members of the Commission as of August 2022. Members may hold further positions and/or former positions than are reflected below, but these are not captured in the Commission's membership directory.

European Group

North American Group

Asia Pacific Group

Global members
Global members are appointed from countries that do not fall within the scope of any of the three regional groups, particularly Africa, Eastern Europe, and the Middle East. They attend the Commission's annual plenary meetings, but not the regional meetings.

Former members in public service
To help preserve the Commission's unofficial charter, members who enter in government roles must relinquish their membership.

David Rockefeller Fellows
Since 2013, each of the regional groups has granted David Rockefeller Fellowships to individuals from countries under their jurisdiction. Fellows are appointed for three-year terms, and are expected to attend at both annual plenary and regional meetings.

Notes

References

International relations